The Ambassador of Malaysia to the Federal Republic of Germany is the head of Malaysia's diplomatic mission to Germany. The position has the rank and status of an Ambassador Extraordinary and Plenipotentiary and is based in the Embassy of Malaysia, Berlin.

List of heads of mission

Ambassadors to Germany

See also
 Germany–Malaysia relations

References 

 
Germany
Malaysia